Alexander Square is a garden square in London's Chelsea district, SW3.

In 1826 John Alexander, the inheritor of the Thurlow Estate as a descendant of the first husband of Anna Maria Browne, drew up plans to for a speculative development with the builder James Bonnin. Alexander Square and South Street, Alfred Place, North Terrace, Alexander Place and York Cottages were subsequently built. George Basevi became the architect of the scheme when under construction in 1829.

The average price of a property in Alexander Square was £7.3 million in 2019.

5–12, 13–20, and 21–24 Alexander Square are listed Grade II on the National Heritage List for England.

Notable residents
No. 24 was the residence of the architect and journalist George Godwin. His residence is marked by a Greater London Council blue plaque placed in 1969.

References

1830 in London
Communal gardens
Garden squares in London
George Basevi buildings
Grade II listed houses in the Royal Borough of Kensington and Chelsea
Houses completed in 1830
South Kensington
Squares in the Royal Borough of Kensington and Chelsea
Streets in the Royal Borough of Kensington and Chelsea